Clifford "Cliff" Woodhead (17 August 1908 – June 1985) was an English professional footballer who played as a full back. He made over 300 appearances for Hull in City the Football League and FA Cup and has been included in various fan best ever Hull City XI teams.

Playing career
Woodhead was born in Darfield, Barnsley and played for a number of local Yorkshire non-league teams including Dearne Valley Old Boys, Ardsley Athletic and Frickley Colliery, before catching the attention of Barnsley and Hull City. He had a trial at Oakwell for Barnsley before signing for Hull City in 1930. During the war he continued to play for Hull City in the wartime competitions and also made guest appearances for York City, whilst serving in the Royal Navy, after the war he played briefly for Goole Town.

Managerial career
Woodhead was appointed trainer at Hull City in 1948, guiding the juniors to the Northern Intermediate League title in 1953.

References

External links
Official Frickley Athletic museum and hall of fame website

1908 births
1985 deaths
People from Darfield, South Yorkshire
English footballers
Association football fullbacks
Ardsley Athletic F.C. players
Frickley Athletic F.C. players
Denaby United F.C. players
Hull City A.F.C. players
Goole Town F.C. players
English Football League players
York City F.C. wartime guest players
Place of death missing